Stephen Decatur High School (commonly Stephen Decatur, Stephen Decatur High, SDHS) is a four-year public high school in Berlin, Worcester County, Maryland, United States. With the grades of 912 the school is a part of Worcester County Public Schools. It is one of four public high schools in Worcester County along with Pocomoke High School, Worcester Technical High School, and Snow Hill High School.  The school was opened in 1954.

About the school
Stephen Decatur High School was named after Stephen Decatur, the naval war hero during the War of 1812 who was born in Worcester County.  He was a Commodore and also fought in the Second Barbary War against pirates in the Mediterranean Sea.

The school is part of the Worcester County Public School system, which also includes three other high schools, Snow Hill High School, Pocomoke High School, and one vocational school, Worcester Technical High School.

Construction on the school began in 1952 and Stephen Decatur High School was dedicated in 1954.  It was a consolidation of two old high schools, Ocean City High School in Ocean City, MD and Buckingham High School in Berlin, MD.    The school originally served grades 7 through 12.  The current facility has .

Students

The graduation rate at Stephen Decatur High School is consistently above 90 percent.  In 2015 the school had a graduation rate of 93.73%.

The area of West Ocean City, Ocean Pines, and Berlin experienced significant growth in the 1990s and 2000s, and that was reflected in the student population at Stephen Decatur High School.  From 895 students in 1993, the school had an enrollment of 1,436 in 2007.  The growth of the area slowed around the time of the Great Recession, and as a result the student population at Stephen Decatur has remained relatively steady over the past decade.

Staff
The following people have been the principal at Stephen Decatur High School:

Sports

State champions
 2023 - Wrestling (2A)
 2022 - Wrestling (2A)
 2020 - Wrestling (2A)
 2019 - Wrestling (3A)
 2008 - Wrestling (4A-3A)
 2002 - Boys Soccer (2A)
 1986 - Boys Track & Field (Class C)
 1970 - Boys Basketball (Class B)

State finalists
 2016 - Boys Basketball (3A)
 2015 - Girls Lacrosse (3A-2A)
 2011 - Boys Swimming (3A-2A-1A)
 2006 - Girls Lacrosse (3A-2A)
 2005 - Golf (2A-1A)
 2001 - Boys Soccer (2A)
 2000 - Boys Track & Field (2A)
 1985 - Boys Track & Field (Class C)
 1984 - Boys Track & Field (Class C)
 1977 - Girls Basketball (Class B)
 1971 - Boys Basketball (Class B)
 1969 - Boys Basketball (Class B)

Robotics
 2014 - FIRST Robotics Competition Team #4288 North Carolina Regional Champion
 2013 - FIRST LEGO League - Salisbury Qualifiers Champion
 2012 - FIRST LEGO League - Salisbury Qualifiers Champion
 2012 - FIRST Robotics Competition #4288 - Battle of Baltimore

Notable alumni

 Dale R. Cathell, judge, Maryland Court of Appeals
 John Chester, co-creator of Random 1, television program on A&E
 Linda Harrison, actress
 Erica Messer, writer for The OC, Alias, and Criminal Minds
 Oliver Purnell, head basketball coach at DePaul University

See also
 Worcester County Public Schools
 List of high schools in Maryland

References

External links
 
 Google Maps

Berlin, Maryland
Educational institutions established in 1954
Public high schools in Maryland
Schools in Worcester County, Maryland
1954 establishments in Maryland